Hlyboka (German and) is an urban-type settlement in Chernivtsi Raion, Chernivtsi Oblast of western Ukraine. It hosts the administration of Hlyboka settlement hromada, one of the hromadas of Ukraine. Population:

History
Hlyboka is mentioned for the first time in 1438.

Before World War II, large parts of lands of Hlyboka were owned by Polish noble families: until 1892 by Prince Adam Sapieha, then by Bronislaw Skibniewski (1830–1904) and later by his son Aleksander Skibniewski (1868–1942).

Until 18 July 2020, Hlyboka served as an administrative center of Hlyboka Raion. The raion was abolished in July 2020 as part of the administrative reform of Ukraine, which reduced the number of raions of Chernivtsi Oblast to three. The area of Hlyboka Raion was merged into Chernivtsi Raion.

International relations

Twin towns - sister cities
Hlyboka is twinned with:
Piatra Neamț, Romania

Hlyboka on old photographs

References
Notes

External links

Hlybostky Raion official website
Train in Hlyboka
Old photos of Hlyboka

Urban-type settlements in Chernivtsi Raion
Bukovina